Tropical Storm Ella may refer to:

 Storms in the Atlantic
 Hurricane Ella (1958) – deadly hurricane in Haiti and Cuba with over 35 deaths; tracked from the Lesser Antilles to southern Texas where it dissipated
 Hurricane Ella (1962) – strongest hurricane of the season; formed near Bahamas and tracked through the western Atlantic Ocean
 Tropical Storm Ella (1966) – tracked from tropical Atlantic before dissipating north of the Lesser Antilles
 Hurricane Ella (1970) – struck northeastern Mexico as a major hurricane
 Hurricane Ella (1978) – strongest hurricane of the season; reached Category 4 status east of Maryland and south of Nova Scotia before brushing Newfoundland

 Western Pacific
 Tropical Storm Ella (1997) (23W, Japan Meteorological Agency analyzed it as a tropical depression, not as a tropical storm.) – Short-lived tropical storm that dissipated near the Northern Marianas Islands

 Southwest Indian Ocean
 Tropical Storm Ella (1976) – Short-lived storm that persisted to the northwest of Madagascar

 Australia Region
 Tropical Storm Ella (1968) – Short-lived weak tropical storm

 South Pacific Ocean
 Tropical Storm Ella (1999) – Tropical storm that passed through the Loyalty Islands, causing some damage on Lifou Island but no reported casualties.

Atlantic hurricane set index articles
Pacific typhoon set index articles
South-West Indian Ocean cyclone set index articles
Australian region cyclone set index articles
South Pacific cyclone set index articles